The men's PTVI triathlon is part of the Triathlon at the 2022 Commonwealth Games program. The competition will be held on 31 July 2022 in Sutton Park near Sutton Coldfield, West Midlands. The event will feature eleven triathletes from six nations, and eleven sighted guides. This is the second men's paratriathlon at the Commonwealth Games, and the first for athletes with a visual impairment.

Schedule
All times are British Summer Time

Competition format

The race will be held over the "sprint distance" and consist of  swimming,  road bicycling, and  road running. Triathletes were selected on the basis of World Triathlon para-triathlon PTVI rankings, with one quota held over for the bitartite invitation process, awarded to James Njorogi of Kenya, though ultimately he did not contest the race.

Field

References

Triathlon at the 2022 Commonwealth Games